Tonton Walombua Semakala (born April 5, 1975 in Kinshasa) is a professional boxer from Sweden, who was born in Zaire. Nicknamed The New Swedish Hammer, Semakala's most notable performance as an amateur was winning the bronze medal at the 1997 World Amateur Boxing Championships in Budapest, Hungary. There he was defeated in the semifinal of the light-welterweight division (– 63.5 kilograms) by Georgia's eventual silver medalist Paata Gvasalia. A year later he turned professional.

References

1975 births
Living people
Sportspeople from Kinshasa
Light-welterweight boxers
Swedish male boxers
AIBA World Boxing Championships medalists
20th-century Swedish people